Troglocyclocheilus khammouanensis is a species of cyprinid fish found in caves in Laos.  It is the only species in its genus and is known from a single specimen collected in Laos in 1998.

References

 

Cave fish
Cyprinid fish of Asia
Fish of Laos
Fish described in 1999